The 2013 Seattle Mariners season was the 37th season in franchise history. The Mariners played their 14th full season (15th overall) at Safeco Field. They finished with a record of 71–91 and 4th place in the AL West.

Standings

American League West

American League Wild Card

Record against opponents

Game log

|-  style="text-align:center; background:#bfb;"
| 1 || April 1 || @ Athletics  || 2–0 || Hernández (1–0) || Anderson (0–1) || Wilhelmsen (1) || 36,067 || 1–0 || 
|-  style="text-align:center; background:#bfb;"
| 2 || April 2 || @ Athletics || 7–1 || Iwakuma (1–0) || Parker (0–1) || — || 15,315 || 2–0 || 
|-  style="text-align:center; background:#fbb;"
| 3 || April 3 || @ Athletics || 2–6 || Milone (1–0) || Saunders (0–1) || — || 15,162 || 2–1 ||
|-  style="text-align:center; background:#fbb;"
| 4 || April 4 || @ Athletics || 2–8 || Griffin (1–0) || Maurer (0–1) || — || 12,134 || 2–2 || 
|-  style="text-align:center; background:#bfb"
| 5 || April 5 || @ White Sox ||  8–7 (F/10) || Loe (1–0) || Jones (0–1) || Wilhelmsen (2) || 15,312 || 3–2 ||
|-  style="text-align:center; background:#fbb"
| 6 || April 6 || @ White Sox ||  3–4 || Veal (1–0) || Hernández (1–1) || Reed (3) || 22,461 || 3–3 ||
|-  style="text-align:center; background:#fbb"
| 7 || April 7 || @ White Sox ||  3–4 (F/10) || Reed (1–0) || Loe (1–1) || — || 18,708 || 3–4 ||
|-  style="text-align:center; background:#bfb"
| 8 || April 8 || Astros || 3–0 || Saunders (1–1) || Humber (0–2) || Wilhelmsen (3) || 42,589 || 4–4 ||
|-  style="text-align:center; background:#fbb"
| 9 || April 9 || Astros || 9–16 || Clemens (1–0) || Maurer (0–2) || — || 10,745 || 4–5 ||
|-  style="text-align:center; background:#fbb"
| 10 || April 10 || Astros || 3–8 || Peacock (1–1) || Beavan (0–1) || — || 10,493 || 4–6 ||
|-  style="text-align:center; background:#fbb"
| 11 || April 11 || Rangers || 3–4 || Ortiz (1–0) || Hernández (1–2) || Nathan (3) || 22,917 || 4–7 ||
|-  style="text-align:center; background:#bfb"
| 12 || April 12 || Rangers || 3–1 || Iwakuma (2–0) || Darvish (2–1) || Wilhelmsen (4) || 15,029 || 5–7 ||
|-  style="text-align:center; background:#fbb"
| 13 || April 13 || Rangers || 1–3 || Ortiz (2–0) || Capps (0–1) || Nathan (4) || 23,461 || 5–8 ||
|-  style="text-align:center; background:#bfb"
| 14 || April 14 || Rangers || 4–3 || Maurer (1–2) || Tepesch (1–1) || Wilhelmsen (5) || 16,981 || 6–8 ||
|-  style="text-align:center; background:#fbb"
| 15 || April 16 || Tigers || 2–6 || Fister (3–0) || Harang (0–1) || — || 12,379 || 6–9 ||
|-  style="text-align:center; background:#fbb"
| 16 || April 17 || Tigers || 1–2 (F/14) || Smyly (1–0) || Furbush (0–1) || Benoit (1) || 14,981 || 6–10 ||
|-  style="text-align:center; background:#bfb"
| 17 || April 18 || Tigers ||  2–0 || Capps (1–1) || Verlander (2–2) || Wilhelmsen (6) || 15,742 || 7–10 ||
|-  style="text-align:center; background:#fbb"
| 18 || April 19 || @ Rangers || 0–7 || Darvish (3–1) || Saunders (1–2) || — || 36,273 || 7–11 ||
|-  style="text-align:center; background:#fbb"
| 19 || April 20 || @ Rangers || 0–5 || Lowe (1–0) || Maurer (1–3) || — || 43,025 || 7–12 ||
|-  style="text-align:center; background:#fbb"
| 20 || April 21 || @ Rangers || 3–11 || Grimm (1–0) || Harang (0–2) || Kirkman (1) || 44,599 || 7–13 ||
|-  style="text-align:center; background:#bfb"
| 21 || April 22 || @ Astros || 7–1 || Hernández (2–2) || Peacock (1–2) || — || 23,201 || 8–13 ||
|-  style="text-align:center; background:#fbb"
| 22 || April 23 || @ Astros || 2–3 || Norris (3–2) || Iwakuma (2–1) || Veras (2) || 13,929 || 8–14 ||
|-  style="text-align:center; background:#fbb"
| 23 || April 24 || @ Astros || 3–10 || Harrell (2–2) || Saunders (1–3) || — || 11,686 || 8–15 ||
|-  style="text-align:center; background:#bfb"
| 24 || April 25 || Angels || 6–0 || Maurer (2–3) || Richards (1–1) || — || 13,000 || 9–15 ||
|-  style="text-align:center; background:#fbb"
| 25 || April 26 || Angels || 3–6 || Wilson (2–0) || Harang (0–3) || Frieri (3) || 31,543 || 9–16 ||
|-  style="text-align:center; background:#bfb"
| 26 || April 27 || Angels || 3–2 || Hernández (3–2) || Blanton (0–4) || Wilhelmsen (7) || 31,901 || 10–16 ||
|-  style="text-align:center; background:#bfb"
| 27 || April 28 || Angels || 2–1 || Capps (2–1) || Vargas (0–3) || Wilhelmsen (8) || 20,638 || 11–16 ||
|-  style="text-align:center; background:#bfb"
| 28 || April 29 || Orioles || 6–2 || Saunders (2–3) || Britton (0–1) || — || 9,818 || 12–16 ||
|-  style="text-align:center; background:#fbb"
| 29 || April 30 || Orioles || 2–7 || Hammel (4–1) || Maurer (2–4) || — || 13,629 || 12–17 ||
|-

|-  style="text-align:center; background:#bfb"
| 30 || May 1 || Orioles  || 8–3 || Harang (1–3) || Chen (2–3) || — || 12,936 || 13–17 || 
|-  style="text-align:center; background:#bfb"
| 31 || May 3 || @ Blue Jays  || 4–0 || Hernández (4–2) || Romero (0–1) || — || 23,779 || 14–17 || 
|-  style="text-align:center; background:#bfb"
| 32 || May 4 || @ Blue Jays  || 8–1 || Iwakuma (3–1) || Dickey (2–5) || — || 35,754 || 15–17 ||  
|-  style="text-align:center; background:#fbb"
| 33 || May 5 || @ Blue Jays  || 2–10 || Morrow (1–2) || Saunders (2–4) || — || 22,937 || 15–18 || 
|-  style="text-align:center; background:#fbb"
| 34 || May 7 || @ Pirates  || 1–4 || Gómez (2–0) || Harang (1–4) || Grilli (13) || 12,973 || 15–19 || 
|-  style="text-align:center; background:#bfb"
| 35 || May 8 || @ Pirates  || 2–1 || Hernández (5–2) || Burnett (3–3) || Wilhelmsen (9) || 18,877 || 16–19 ||  
|-  style="text-align:center; background:#bfb"
| 36 || May 10 || Athletics  || 6–3 || Iwakuma (4–1) || Straily (1–1) || Wilhelmsen (10) || 25,509 || 17–19 ||   
|-  style="text-align:center; background:#fbb"
| 37 || May 11 || Athletics  || 3–4 || Parker (2–5) || Maurer (2–5) || Balfour (6) || 30,089 || 17–20 || 
|-  style="text-align:center; background:#bfb"
| 38 || May 12 || Athletics  || 6–1 || Saunders (3–4) || Milone (3–5) || — || 27,599 || 18–20 || 
|-  style="text-align:center; background:#fbb"
| 39 || May 14 || @ Yankees  || 3–4 || Kelley (2–0) || Furbush (0–2) || Rivera (16) || 41,267 || 18–21 || 
|-  style="text-align:center; background:#bfb"
| 40 || May 15 || @ Yankees  || 12–2 || Iwakuma (5–1) || Hughes (0–2) || — || 41,267 || 19–21 || 
|-  style="text-align:center; background:#bfb"
| 41 || May 16 || @ Yankees  || 3–2 || Pérez (1–0) || Pettitte (4–3) || Wilhelmsen (11) || 35,392 || 20–21 || 
|-  style="text-align:center; background:#fbb"
| 42 || May 17 || @ Indians  || 3–6 (F/10) || Pestano (1–0) || Leutge (0–1) || — || 34,282 || 20–22 ||  
|-  style="text-align:center; background:#fbb"
| 43 || May 18 || @ Indians  || 4–5 || Perez (2–0) || Pérez (1–1) || — || 17,574 || 20–23 || 
|-  style="text-align:center; background:#fbb"
| 44 || May 19 || @ Indians  || 0–6 || Masterson (7–2) || Hernández (5–3) || — || 19,744 || 20–24 ||  
|-  style="text-align:center; background:#fbb"
| 45 || May 20 || @ Indians  || 8–10 (F/10) || Smith (2–0) || Furbush (0–3) || — || 19,390 || 20–25 ||   
|-  style="text-align:center; background:#fbb"
| 46 || May 21 || @ Angels  || 0–12 || Williams (3–1) || Harang (1–5) || — || 34,095 || 20–26 || 
|-  style="text-align:center; background:#fbb"
| 47 || May 22 || @ Angels  || 1–7 || Wilson (4–3) || Maurer (2–6) || — || 33,313 || 20–27 ||
|-  style="text-align:center; background:#fbb"
| 48 || May 24 || Rangers  || 5–9 || Grimm (4–3) || Saunders (3–5) || Nathan (15) || 22,053 || 20–28 || 
|-  style="text-align:center; background:#fbb"
| 49 || May 25 || Rangers  || 2–5 || Holland (4–2) || Hernández (5–4) || Nathan (16) || 35,022 || 20–29 || 
|-  style="text-align:center; background:#bfb"
| 50 || May 26 || Rangers  || 4–3 (F/13) || Medina (1–0) || Kirkman (0–1) || — || 23,154 || 21–29 ||
|-  style="text-align:center; background:#bfb"
| 51 || May 27 || Padres  || 9–0 || Harang (2–5) || Richard (0–5) || — || 18,942 || 22–29 ||
|-  style="text-align:center; background:#fbb"
| 52 || May 28 || Padres  || 1–6 || Vólquez (4–5) || Maurer (2–7) || — || 11,911 || 22–30 ||
|-  style="text-align:center; background:#fbb"
| 53 || May 29 || @ Padres  || 2–3 (F/10) || Gregerson (3–2) || Medina (1–1) || — || 19,882 || 22–31 ||
|-  style="text-align:center; background:#bfb"
| 54 || May 30 || @ Padres  || 7–1 || Hernández (6–2) || Cashner (4–3) || — || 18,809 || 23–31 ||
|-  style="text-align:center; background:#bfb"
| 55 || May 31 || @ Twins  || 3–0 || Iwakuma (6-1) || Pelfrey (3-6) || Wilhelmsen (12) || 31,430 || 24-31 ||
|-

|-  style="text-align:center; background:#fbb"
| 56 || June 1 || @ Twins  || 4–5 || Thielbar (1–0) || Wilhelmsen (0–1) || — || 33,417 || 24–32 ||
|-  style="text-align:center; background:#fbb"
| 57 || June 2 || @ Twins  || 0–10 || Diamond (4–4) || Bonderman (0–1) || — || 34,876 || 24–33 ||
|-  style="text-align:center; background:#bfb"
| 58 || June 3 || White Sox  || 4–2 || Saunders  (4–5) || Danks (0–2) ||  Wilhelmsen (13) || 13,491 || 25–33 ||
|-  style="text-align:center; background:#bfb"
| 59 || June 4 || White Sox || 7–4 || Hernández (7–4) || Peavy (6–4) || Wilhelmsen (14) || 16,294 || 26–33 ||
|- style="text-align:center; background:#fbb"
| 60 || June 5 || White Sox || 5–7 (F/16) || Reed (2–0) || Noesí (0–1) || — || 20,139 || 26–34 ||
|-  style="text-align:center; background:#fbb"
| 61 || June 6 || Yankees  || 1–6 || Hughes (3–4) || Harang (2–6) || — || 18,776 || 26–35 ||
|-  style="text-align:center; background:#bfb"
| 62 || June 7 || Yankees  || 4–1 || Bonderman (1–1) || Kuroda (6–5) || Wilhelmsen (15) || 26,248 || 27–35 ||
|-  style="text-align:center; background:#fbb"
| 63 || June 8 || Yankees  || 1-3 || Pettitte (5-3) || Saunders (4-6) || Rivera (22) || 38,252 || 27-36 ||
|-  style="text-align:center; background:#fbb"
| 64 || June 9 || Yankees  || 1-2 || Robertson (4-1) || Medina (1-2) || Rivera (23) || 43,389 || 27-37 ||
|-  style="text-align:center; background:#bfb"
| 65 || June 10 || Astros  || 3-2 || Iwakuma (7-1) || Keuchel (3-3) || Wilhelmsen (16) || 12,811 || 28-37 ||
|-  style="text-align:center; background:#bfb"
| 66 || June 11 || Astros  || 4-0 || Harang (3-6) || Norris (5-6) || – || 10,266 || 28-38 ||
|-  style="text-align:center; background:#fbb"
| 67 || June 12 || Astros  || 1-6 || Clemens (4-2) || Wilhelmsen (0-2) || – || 13,823 || 29-38 ||
|-  style="text-align:center; background:#bfb"
| 68 || June 14 || @ Athletics  || 3-2 || Saunders (5-6) || Milone (6-6) || Pérez (1) || 31,448 || 30-38 ||
|-  style="text-align:center; background:#bfb"
| 69 || June 15 || @ Athletics  || 4-0 || Hernández (8-4) || Griffin (5-6) || – || 24,378 || 31-38 ||
|-  style="text-align:center; background:#fbb"
| 70 || June 16 || @ Athletics  || 2-10 || Colón (9-2) || Iwakuma (7-2) || – || 36,067 || 31-39 ||
|-  style="text-align:center; background:#fbb"
| 71 || June 17 || @ Angels  || 3-11 || Vargas (6-4) || Harang (3-7) || – || 30,258 || 31-40 ||
|-  style="text-align:center; background:#bfb"
| 72 || June 18 || @ Angels  || 3-2 (F/10) || Furbush (1-3) || Richards (2-4) || Medina (1) || 33,040 || 32-40 ||
|-  style="text-align:center; background:#fbb"
| 73 || June 19 || @ Angels  || 0-1 || Wilson (6-5) || Saunders (5-7) || Frieri (16) || 35,401 || 32-41 ||
|-  style="text-align:center; background:#fbb"
| 74 || June 20 || @ Angels  || 9-10 || Downs (1-2) || Capps (2-2) || Frieri (17) || 37,711 || 32-42 ||
|-  style="text-align:center; background:#fbb"
| 75 || June 21 || Athletics  || 3-6 || Colón (10-2) || Iwakuma (7-3) || Balfour (18) || 23,086 || 32-43 ||
|-  style="text-align:center; background:#bfb"
| 76 || June 22 || Athletics  || 7-5 || Medina (2-2) || Cook (1-1) || – || 20,704 || 33-43 ||
|-  style="text-align:center; background:#bfb"
| 77 || June 23 || Athletics  || 6-3 (F/10) || Pérez (2-1) || Balfour (0-1) || – || 22,813 || 34-43 ||
|-  style="text-align:center; background:#fbb"
| 78 || June 25 || Pirates  || 4-9 || Locke (7-1) || Saunders (5-8) || – || 21,074 || 34-44 ||
|-  style="text-align:center; background:#fbb"
| 79 || June 26 || Pirates  || 2-4 || Mazzaro (4-2) || Furbush (1-4) || Melancon (2) || 21,265 || 34-45 ||
|-  style="text-align:center; background:#bfb"
| 80 || June 28 || Cubs || 5-4 (F/10) || Medina (3-2) || Parker (0-1) || – || 31,471 || 35-45 ||
|-  style="text-align:center; background:#fbb"
| 81 || June 29 || Cubs || 3-5 (F/11) || Villanueva (2-4) || Pérez (2-2) || Parker (1) || 34,630 || 35-46 ||
|-  style="text-align:center; background:#fbb"
| 82 || June 30 || Cubs || 6-7 || Jackson (4-10) || Bonderman (1-2) || Gregg (13) || 24,701 || 35-47 ||
|-

|-  style="text-align:center; background:#bfb"
| 83 || July 2 || @ Rangers  || 9-2 || Saunders (6-8) || Grimm (7-6) || – || 39,579 || 36-47 ||
|-  style="text-align:center; background:#bfb"
| 84 || July 3 || @ Rangers  || 4-2 (F/10) || Furbush (2-4) || Ross (4-2) || Wilhelmsen (17) || 39,468 || 37-47 ||
|-  style="text-align:center; background:#fbb"
| 85 || July 4 || @ Rangers  || 4-5 || Lindblom (1-2) || Iwakuma (7-4) || Nathan (28) || 46,476 || 37-48 ||
|-  style="text-align:center; background:#bfb"
| 86 || July 5 || @ Reds  || 4-2 || Harang (4-7) || Leake (7-4) || Pérez (2) || 33,596 || 38-48 ||
|-  style="text-align:center; background:#fbb"
| 87 || July 6 || @ Reds  || 4-13 || Latos (8-2) || Bonderman (1-3) || – || 34,965 || 38-49 ||
|-  style="text-align:center; background:#bfb"
| 88 || July 7 || @ Reds  || 3-1 || Saunders (7-8) || Arroyo (7-7) || Wilhelmsen (18) || 32,669 || 39-49 ||
|-  style="text-align:center; background:#bfb"
| 89 || July 8 || Red Sox  || 11-4 || Hernández (9-4) || Lester (8-5) || – || 21,830 || 40-49 ||
|-  style="text-align:center; background:#fbb"
| 90 || July 9 || Red Sox  || 8-11 || Breslow (3-2) || Beavan (0-2) || Uehara (6) || 21,076 || 40-50 ||
|-  style="text-align:center; background:#fbb"
| 91 || July 10 || Red Sox  || 4-11 || Doubront (6-3) || Harang (4-8) || – || 20,468 || 40-51 ||
|-  style="text-align:center; background:#fbb"
| 92 || July 11 || Red Sox  || 7-8 (F/10) || Wright (1-0) || Wilhelmsen (0-3) || Uehara (7) || 25,367 || 40-52 ||
|-  style="text-align:center; background:#bfb"
| 93 || July 12 || Angels  || 8-3 || Saunders (8-8) || Williams (5-5) || – || 21,375 || 41-52 ||
|-  style="text-align:center; background:#bfb"
| 94 || July 13 || Angels  || 6-0 || Hernández (10-4) || Weaver (3-5) || – || 32,466 || 42-52 ||
|-  style="text-align:center; background:#bfb"
| 95 || July 14 || Angels  || 4-3 || Iwakuma (8-4) || Blanton (2-12) || Wilhelmsen (19) || 25,643 || 43-52 ||
|-  style="text-align:center; background:#bfb"
| 96 || July 19 || @ Astros  || 10-7 || Saunders (9-8) || Norris (6-9) || Wilhelmsen (20) || 24,635 || 44-52 ||
|-  style="text-align:center; background:#bfb"
| 97 || July 20 || @ Astros  || 4-2 || Iwakuma (9-4) || Bédard (3-7) || Wilhelmsen (21) || 25,733 || 45-52 ||
|-  style="text-align:center; background:#bfb"
| 98 || July 21 || @ Astros  || 12-5 || Hernández (11-4) || Lyles (4-4) || – || 38,838 || 46-52 ||
|-  style="text-align:center; background:#bfb"
| 99 || July 22 || Indians  || 2-1 || Harang (5-8) || Jiménez (7-5) || Wilhelmsen (22) || 18,009 || 47-52 ||
|-  style="text-align:center; background:#bfb"
| 100 || July 23 || Indians  || 4-3 || Ramirez (1-0) || McAllister (4-6) || Wilhelmsen (23) || 16,308 || 48-52 ||
|-  style="text-align:center; background:#fbb"
| 101 || July 24 || Indians  || 1-10 || Kazmir (6-4) || Saunders (9-9) || – || 25,688 || 48-53 ||
|-  style="text-align:center; background:#bfb"
| 102 || July 25 || Twins  || 8-2 || Iwakuma (10-4) || Correia (7-7) || – || 18,135 || 49-53 ||
|-  style="text-align:center; background:#fbb"
| 103 || July 26 || Twins  || 2-3 (F/13) || Duensing (3-1) || Medina (3-3) || Perkins (25) || 23,162 || 49-54 ||
|-  style="text-align:center; background:#fbb"
| 104 || July 27 || Twins  || 0-4 || Deduno (7-4) || Harang (5-9) || – || 24,524 || 49-55 ||
|-  style="text-align:center; background:#bfb"
| 105 || July 28 || Twins  || 6-4 || Ramirez (2-0) || Gibson (2-3) || Wilhelmsen (24) || 35,087 || 50-55 ||
|-  style="text-align:center; background:#fbb"
| 106 || July 30 || @ Red Sox  || 2-8 || Workman (1-1) || Saunders (9-10) || – || 34,578 || 50-56 ||
|-  style="text-align:center; background:#fbb"
| 107 || July 31 || @ Red Sox  || 4-5 (F/15) || Britton (1-0) || Luetge (0-2) || – || 35,059 || 50-57 ||
|-

|-  style="text-align:center; background:#fbb"
| 108 || August 1 || @ Red Sox  || 7-8 || Wright (2-0) || Pérez (2-3) || – || 35,886 || 50-58 ||
|-  style="text-align:center; background:#fbb"
| 109 || August 2 || @ Orioles  || 8-11 || Tillman (14-3) || Harang (5-10) || Johnson (38) || 25,947 || 50-59 ||
|-  style="text-align:center; background:#bfb"
| 110 || August 3 || @ Orioles  || 8-4 || Ramirez (3-0) || Feldman (9-9) || Farquhar (1) || 35,231 || 51-59 ||
|-  style="text-align:center; background:#bfb"
| 111 || August 4 || @ Orioles  || 3-2 || Saunders (10-10) || Chen (6-4) || Farquhar (2) || 30,759 || 52-59 ||
|-  style="text-align:center; background:#fbb"
| 112 || August 5 || Blue Jays  || 1-3 || Dickey (9-11) || Iwakuma (10-5) || Janssen (20) || 32,300 || 52-60 ||
|-  style="text-align:center; background:#fbb"
| 113 || August 6 || Blue Jays  || 2-7 || Johnson (2-8) || Hernández (11-5) || – || 28,198 || 52-61 ||
|-  style="text-align:center; background:#bfb"
| 114 || August 7 || Blue Jays  || 9-7 || Maurer (3-7) || Loup (4-4) || Farquhar (3) || 34,792 || 53-61 ||
|-  style="text-align:center; background:#fbb"
| 115 || August 9 || Brewers  || 5-10 || Lohse (8-7) || Saunders (10-11) || – || 34,827 || 53-62 ||
|-  style="text-align:center; background:#fbb"
| 116 || August 10 || Brewers  || 0-10 || Gorzelanny (3-4) || Iwakuma (10-6) || – || 46,027 || 53-63 ||
|-  style="text-align:center; background:#bfb"
| 117 || August 11 || Brewers  || 2-0 || Hernández (12-5) || Peralta (8-12) || Farquhar (4) || 25,390 || 54-63 ||
|-  style="text-align:center; background:#bfb"
| 118 || August 13 || @ Rays  || 5-4 || Ramirez (4-0) || Archer (6-5) || Farquhar (5) || 13,294 || 55-63 ||
|-  style="text-align:center; background:#fbb"
| 119 || August 14 || @ Rays  || 4-5 || Peralta (2-5) || Farquhar (0-1) || – || 14,910 || 55-64 ||
|-  style="text-align:center; background:#fbb"
| 120 || August 15 || @ Rays  || 1-7 || Cobb (7-2) || Saunders (10-12) || – || 13,299 || 55-65 ||
|-  style="text-align:center; background:#bfb"
| 121 || August 16 || @ Rangers  || 3-1 || Iwakuma (11-6) || Cotts (4-2) || Farquhar (6) || 37,596 || 56-65 ||
|-  style="text-align:center; background:#fbb"
| 122 || August 17 || @ Rangers  || 3-15 || Perez (6-3) || Hernández (12-6) || – || 44,247 || 56-66 ||
|-  style="text-align:center; background:#bfb"
| 123 || August 18 || @ Rangers  || 4-3 || Medina (4-3) || Nathan (3-2) || Farquhar (7) || 40,832 || 57-66 ||
|-  style="text-align:center; background:#fbb"
| 124 || August 19 || @ Athletics  || 1-2 || Parker (9-6) || Capps (2-3) || – || 11,112 || 57-67 ||
|-  style="text-align:center; background:#bfb"
| 125 || August 20 || @ Athletics  || 7-4 || Maurer (4-7) || Doolittle (4-5) || Farquhar (8) || 13,041 || 58-67 ||
|-  style="text-align:center; background:#bfb"
| 126 || August 21 || @ Athletics  || 5-3 || Iwakuma (12-6) || Griffin (10-9) || Farquhar (9) || 18,641 || 59-67 ||
|-  style="text-align:center; background:#fbb"
| 127 || August 23 || Angels  || 0-2 || Richards (4-5) || Hernández (12-7) || Frieri (27) || 21,616  || 59-68 || 
|-  style="text-align:center; background:#fbb"
| 128 || August 24 || Angels  || 1-5 || Vargas (7-5) || Ramírez (4-1) || – || 24,477 || 59-69 ||
|-  style="text-align:center; background:#fbb"
| 129 || August 25 || Angels  || 1-7 || Weaver (8-7) || Harang (5-11) || – || 22,999 || 59-70 ||
|-  style="text-align:center; background:#fbb"
| 130 || August 26 || Rangers  || 3-8 || Blackley (2-1) || Saunders (10-13) || – || 15,995 || 59-71 ||
|-  style="text-align:center; background:#fbb"
| 131 || August 27 || Rangers  || 3-4 (F/10) || Scheppers (6-2) || Farquhar (0-2) || Nathan (38) || 15,115 || 59-72 ||
|-  style="text-align:center; background:#fbb"
| 132 || August 28 || Rangers  || 4-12 || Perez (8-3) || Hernández (12-8) || – || 22,420 || 59-73 ||
|-  style="text-align:center; background:#bfb"
| 133 || August 29 || @ Astros  || 3-2 || Ramírez (5-1) || Lyles (6-7) || Farquhar (10) || 22,203 || 60-73 ||
|-  style="text-align:center; background:#bfb"
| 134 || August 30 || @ Astros  || 7-1 || Walker (1-0) || Peacock (3-5) || – || 13,869 || 61-73 ||
|-  style="text-align:center; background:#bfb"
| 135 || August 31 || @ Astros  || 3-1 || Saunders (11-13) || Keuchel (5-8) || Farquhar (11) || 21,085 || 62-73 ||
|-

|-  style="text-align:center; background:#fbb"
| 136 || September 1 || @ Astros || 0-2 || Oberholtzer (4-1) || Furbush (2-5) || – || 17,203 || 62-74 ||
|-  style="text-align:center; background:#fbb"
| 137 || September 2 || @ Royals || 1-3 || Smith (2-1) || Hernández (12-9) || Holland (37) || 20,063 || 62-75 ||
|-  style="text-align:center; background:#fbb"
| 138 || September 3 || @ Royals || 3-4 || Hochevar (4-2) || Medina (4-4) || Holland (38) || 13,638 || 62-76 ||
|-  style="text-align:center; background:#bfb"
| 139 || September 4 || @ Royals || 6-4 || Luetge (1-2) || Crow (7-5) || Farquhar (12) || 13,621 || 63-76 ||
|-  style="text-align:center; background:#fbb"
| 140 || September 5 || @ Royals || 6-7 (F/13) || Coleman (3-0) || Ruffin (0-1) || – || 14,004 || 63-77 ||
|-  style="text-align:center; background:#bfb"
| 141 || September 6 || Rays || 6-4 || Capps (3-3) || Peralta (2-6) || Farquhar (13) || 14,796 || 64-77 ||
|-  style="text-align:center; background:#bfb"
| 142 || September 7 || Rays || 6-2 || Paxton (1-0) || Archer (8-7) || – || 17,773 || 65-77 ||
|-  style="text-align:center; background:#fbb"
| 143 || September 8 || Rays || 1-4 || McGee (4-3) || Medina (4-5) || Rodney (33) || 18,645 || 65-78 ||
|-  style="text-align:center; background:#fbb"
| 144 || September 9 || Astros || 4-6 || Chapman (1-1) || Farquhar (0-3) || Fields (4) || 9,808 || 65-79 ||
|-  style="text-align:center; background:#fbb"
| 145 || September 10 || Astros || 2-13 || Lyles (7-7) || Saunders (11-14) || – || 10,245 || 65-80 ||
|-  style="text-align:center; background:#fbb"
| 146 || September 11 || Astros || 1-6 || Peacock (5-5) || Maurer (4-8) || Zeid (1) || 11,656 || 65-81 ||
|-  style="text-align:center; background:#fbb"
| 147 || September 13 || @ Cardinals || 1-2 (F/10) || Siegrist (3-1) || Ruffin (0-2) || – || 40,506 || 65-82 ||
|-  style="text-align:center; background:#bfb"
| 148 || September 14 || @ Cardinals || 4-1 || Paxton (2-0) || Wacha (3-1) || Farquhar (14) || 41,374 || 66-82 ||
|-  style="text-align:center; background:#fbb"
| 149 || September 15 || @ Cardinals || 2-12 || Miller (14-9) || Ramírez (5-2) || – || 40,526 || 66-83 ||
|-  style="text-align:center; background:#fbb"
| 150 || September 16 || @ Tigers || 2-4 || Porcello (13-8) || Saunders (11-15) || Benoit (21) || 34,063 || 66-84 ||
|-  style="text-align:center; background:#fbb"
| 151 || September 17 || @ Tigers || 2-6 || Alburquerque (3-3) || Medina (4-6) || – || 39,076 || 66-85 ||
|-  style="text-align:center; background:#bfb"
| 152 || September 18 || @ Tigers || 8-0 || Iwakuma (13-6) || Verlander (13-12) || – || 36,395 || 67-85 ||
|-  style="text-align:center; background:#fbb"
| 153 || September 19 || @ Tigers || 4-5 || Fister (13-9) || Furbush (2-6) || Benoit (22) || 38,431 || 67-86 ||
|-  style="text-align:center; background:#fbb"
| 154 || September 20 || @ Angels || 2-3 (F/11) || Rasmus (1-1) || LaFromboise (0-1) || – || 39,469 || 67-87 ||
|-  style="text-align:center; background:#fbb"
| 155 || September 21 || @ Angels || 5-6 || Williams (9-10) || Saunders (11-16) || Frieri (36) || 41,001 || 67-88 ||
|-  style="text-align:center; background:#bfb"
| 156 || September 22 || @ Angels || 3-2 || Pérez (3-3) || Wilson (17-7) || Farquhar (15) || 39,099 || 68-88 ||
|-  style="text-align:center; background:#fbb"
| 157 || September 23 || Royals || 5-6 || Davis (8-11) || Luetge (1-3) || Holland (45) || 12,790 || 68-89 ||
|-  style="text-align:center; background:#bfb"
| 158 || September 24 || Royals || 4-0 || Paxton (3-0) || Chen (8-4) || – || 12,528 || 69-89 ||
|-  style="text-align:center; background:#bfb"
| 159 || September 25 || Royals || 6-0 || Iwakuma (14-6) || Santana (9-10) || – || 15,347 || 70-89 ||
|-  style="text-align:center; background:#fbb"
| 160 || September 27 || Athletics || 2-8 || Colón (18-6) || Hernández (12-10) || – || 23,014 || 70-90 ||
|-  style="text-align:center; background:#bfb"
| 161 || September 28 || Athletics || 7-5 || Maurer (5-8) || Parker (12-8) || Farquhar (16) || 17,751 || 71-90 ||
|-  style="text-align:center; background:#fbb"
| 162 || September 29 || Athletics || 0-9 || Gray (5-3) || Ramírez (5-3) || – || 17,081 || 71-91 || 
|-

Roster

Players stats

Batting

Note: G = Games played; AB = At bats; R = Runs scored; H = Hits; 2B = Doubles; 3B = Triples; HR = Home runs; RBI = Runs batted in; BB = Base on balls; SB = Stolen bases; AVG = Batting average

Pitching

Note: W = Wins; L = Losses; ERA = Earned run average; G = Games pitched; GS = Games started; SV = Saves; IP = Innings pitched; H = Hits allowed; R = Runs allowed; ER = Earned runs allowed; BB = Walks allowed;  SO = Strikeouts

Farm system

LEAGUE CHAMPIONS: Pulaski

References

External links

2013 Seattle Mariners season Official Site 
2013 Seattle Mariners season at ESPN
2013 Seattle Mariners season at Baseball Reference

Seattle Mariners seasons
Seattle Mariners season
Seasttle Marin
Seattle Mariners